The Ellerby Area Hoard or Ellerby Hoard is a hoard of 266 17th-18th century gold coins found in an manganese-mottled salt-glazed stoneware vessel in a house in Ellerby, East Riding of Yorkshire in 2019.

Discovery and contents
The hoard was discovered during renovations of an 18th century property beneath the kitchen floor. The 266 gold coins were found packed within a stoneware vessel tax-stamped to the reign of Queen Anne (1702-1714). The vessel was nearly complete, manganese-mottled salt-glazed and decorated with ridged geometric markings.  There are coins of several different monarchs represented within the hoard: James VI and I (AD 1603–1625, 34 coins), Charles I (AD 1625–1649, 42 coins), Charles II (AD 1660–1685, 25 coins), James II (AD 1685–1688, 14 coins), William and Mary (AD 1688–1694, 10 coins), William III (AD 1695–1702, 25 coins), Anne (AD 17020–1714, 31 coins), George I (AD 1714–1727, 84 coins), and Joao V of Portugal (AD 1706–1750, 1 coin). The latest coin in the hoard is a guinea of George I dating to AD 1727. The coins would be worth approximately £100,000 in modern monetary values.

Sale
The hoard met the stipulations of the Treasure Act 1996 and was declared Treasure but subsequently disclaimed. The hoard was arranged for sale by Spink & Son at 16:00 on 7 October 2022. The hoard was sold to private collectors for a total hammer price of £628,000 with a final purchase price including fees of £754,000.

References

Metal detecting finds in England
Treasure troves in England
2020 in England
2020 archaeological discoveries
Coin hoards
Archaeological sites in the East Riding of Yorkshire